Carla Muñoz Montesinos (born February 12, 1992) is a Chilean professional racquetball player. She has won multiple medals, including the three consecutive gold medals in the USA Racquetball National Intercollegiate Championships in 2016, 2017, and 2018. In 2014, Munoz was awarded Best Racquetball Player of the Year by the Chilean Journalist Association.  She plays for the Ladies Professional Racquetball Tour and is currently ranked #10 in the world.

In 2016, Muñoz received a two-year scholarship to attend Colorado State University Pueblo to finish her degree in Business and Accounting, and to play for their nationally-ranked racquetball program. In 2017, Carla represented CSU Pueblo at the National Intercollegiate Championships, winning the gold medal in Singles, and the silver medal in Doubles.

Early life
Muñoz was born in Concepción, Chile, the daughter of Glenda Montesinos and Fernando Muñoz. She was raised in the capital city of Santiago along with two sisters and one brother, and was the youngest child. In Santiago, she attended De La Salle School, competing in numerous sports, and studied Flamenco dancing for 8 years.

At the age of 14, Muñoz began playing racquetball after being fascinated by her own father playing the sport, who later taught her the game. After just a few months of playing, she began winning tournaments in the girls' division, then later started to compete with and win against boys her age. At the age of 17, she enrolled in Adolfo Ibáñez University, studying business & engineering, and quit racquetball for nearly two years to focus on her studies. She returned to the sport to compete in the 2011 Pan American Games in Guadalajara, Mexico, where she took home the bronze medal with her doubles partner Angela Grisar. It was then where Muñoz decided that she wanted to become a professional racquetball player. She began traveling to the United States to play in more tournaments and train, knowing it would be difficult due to having no junior career and very little experience in high-level competition.

In 2014, Muñoz moved to the United States, settling in the San Francisco Bay Area to receive more training and play in more tournaments, while also furthering her educational aspirations of becoming an accountant.

Professional career
Muñoz currently plays for the Ladies Professional Racquetball Tour, where she is currently ranked #10 in the world.

International career
Muñoz has performed well in international competition. In 2011, she won the bronze medal in doubles at the Pan American Games. She took home the silver medal in doubles at the World Racquetball Championship in 2012. The 2013 Pan American Racquetball Championship saw her winning the Bronze medal in doubles. Munoz won another Bronze medal in doubles the next year at the 2014 World Racquetball Championship and became ranked #13 in singles.

Muñoz earned a bronze medal in Women's Singles at the 2022 Pan American Racquetball Championships. She defeated American Rhonda Rajsich in the quarterfinals, 15-13, 10-15, 15-11, 15-13, but then lost in the semi-finals to Argentina's Maria Jose Vargas, 11-15, 15-11, 15-7, 15-13. In Women’s Doubles, Muñoz and Paula Mansilla lost in the quarterfinals to Bolivians Micaela Meneses and Yazmine Sabja, 15-9, 15-5, 15-11. In Mixed Doubles, she and Rodrigo Salgado Jr. lost in the quarterfinals to Argentines Valeria Centellas and Diego Garcia, 15-5, 15-6, 15-12.

Other honors
Highest LPRT ranking: #8
Muñoz received the 2014  Best Racquetball Player of the Year award from the Chilean Journalist Association.

See also
 List of racquetball players

Sponsors
Racquetball World
Reaching Your Dream Foundation
Gearbox Racquetball
Chilean Olympic Committee

References

External links
USA Racquetball page for Carla Muñoz
Carla Muñoz's Twitter page
Carla Muñoz's Instagram page
Carla Muñoz's Facebook page

1992 births
Living people
Sportspeople from Santiago
Racquetball players at the 2011 Pan American Games
Pan American Games bronze medalists for Chile
Pan American Games medalists in racquetball
Racquetball players at the 2015 Pan American Games
Chilean racquetball players
Racquetball in Chile
South American Games bronze medalists for Chile
South American Games medalists in racquetball
Competitors at the 2018 South American Games
Racquetball players at the 2019 Pan American Games
Medalists at the 2011 Pan American Games
People from Concepción, Chile
21st-century Chilean people
Competitors at the 2022 World Games